Napoli Mergellina railway station serves the city and comune of Naples, in the region of Campania, Southern Italy.  Opened in 1925, it is the third most important railway station in Naples, after Napoli Centrale and Napoli Campi Flegrei.  It also forms part of the Villa Literno–Napoli Gianturco railway.

The station is currently managed by Rete Ferroviaria Italiana (RFI).  However, the commercial area of the passenger building is managed by Centostazioni.  Train services are operated by Trenitalia.  Each of these companies is a subsidiary of Ferrovie dello Stato (FS), Italy's state-owned rail company.

Location
Napoli Mergellina railway station is on Corso Vittorio Emanuele, to the south west of the city centre.

History
The station was opened on 20 September 1925, upon the inauguration of the Villa Literno–Napoli Gianturco railway. Originally, the station had 5 platforms for passenger services, but since 2009 only platforms 3 and 4 are in operation. Since 2017, the station is unstaffed.

Passenger and train movements
The station has about 6.2 million passenger movements each year.

See also

History of rail transport in Italy
List of railway stations in Campania
Rail transport in Italy
Railway stations in Italy

References

External links

Description and pictures of Napoli Mergellina railway station 

This article is based upon a translation of the Italian language version as at January 2011.

Mergellina
Railway stations opened in 1925
1925 establishments in Italy
Railway stations in Italy opened in the 20th century
Railway stations in Italy opened in the 21st century